Nihat Özdemir (born 5 April 1950) is a Turkish business man, owner of Limak holding and former president of the Turkish Football Federation. He was the Deputy President and Press Spokesman for Turkish Süper Lig football club Fenerbahçe SK.

Limak Holding was launched in 1976 by Özdemir and Sezai Bacaksız, with Özdemir focussing on cement and energy while Bacaksız focussed on airports and tourism. In 2011, Özdemir and Bacaksız were listed as billionaires by Forbes.

See also 
 List of Turks by net worth

References

External links 
 
 

1950 births
Living people
People from Diyarbakır
Turkish mechanical engineers
Turkish businesspeople
Turkish billionaires
Turkish Football Federation presidents
Turkish sports executives and administrators